Walter Klimmek (14 March 1919 – 13 May 2010) was a German football defender, coal miner and firefighter. He played for Schalke 04 and was West German champion and German cup winner. He was 91 and is buried in Aschheim.

References

1919 births
2010 deaths
German footballers
FC Schalke 04 players
German coal miners
German footballers needing infoboxes
Association football defenders